Sredneakbashevo (Urta Aqbaş) is a rural locality (a village) in Sharipovsky Selsoviet, Kushnarenkovsky District, Bashkortostan, Russia. The population was 175 as of 2010. There are 14 streets.

Geography 
Sredneakbashevo is located 26 km southeast of Kushnarenkovo (the district's administrative centre) by road. Nizhneakbashevo is the nearest rural locality.

References 

Rural localities in Kushnarenkovsky District